Merrell Branch is a stream in Ripley County in the U.S. state of Missouri.

Merrell Branch has the name of James and John Merrell, pioneer citizens.

See also
List of rivers of Missouri

References

Rivers of Ripley County, Missouri
Rivers of Missouri